European Masters may refer to:

In Sports:
 Omega European Masters, a golf tournament
 European Masters (curling)
 European Masters (snooker), annual world ranking snooker tournament that takes place on the European continent
 European Masters Swimming Championships
 EHF European Masters Handball Championship
 European Masters Athletics Championships
 European Masters Athletics Championships Non Stadia
 European Masters Games, a quadrenneial multi-sport summer event
 European Young Masters (golf)
 European Senior Masters (disambiguation)

In Education:
 Master's degree in Europe
 European Master post-graduate degree
 European Master in Management
 European Master on Software Engineering
 European Master's in Translation
 European Master's Programme in Human Rights and Democratisation (EMA) 
 Higher Education European Masters

See also

 Master of European Law
 Master of European Design
 European Bowling Tour Masters
 
 
 
 European Championship (disambiguation)
 European Open (disambiguation)